Shields Road subway station is a station of Glasgow Subway, serving the Pollokshields and Kingston areas of Glasgow, Scotland. Nearby is Charles Rennie Mackintosh's Scotland Street School Museum. This was one of four (now three) stations which has Park and Ride facilities.

The station has been left in an industrial area by post-war reconstruction and is isolated from surrounding areas by the M8 motorway and approach roads for the Kingston Bridge. There were 460,000 passengers in the 12 months to 31 March 2005. These trips were largely generated by the adjacent 'Park & Ride' car park. The car park was rebuilt with over 800 spaces in a project that ended in September 2006.

The east end of the car park is closer to the entrance of West Street subway station.

The station is actually on Scotland Street, not Shields Road. There has been some consideration of changing its name.

Shields Road is one of the stations mentioned in Cliff Hanley's song The Glasgow Underground.

Past passenger numbers 
 2004/05: 0.460 million annually
 2011/12: 0.457 million annually

References

Glasgow Subway stations
Railway stations in Great Britain opened in 1896
Pollokshields